Lake Dawson (born January 2, 1972) is a former professional American football player and current executive in the NFL.  He graduated from Federal Way High School in 1990, where he had participated in football, basketball, and track.  He played for the University of Notre Dame from 1990 to 1994 and then was drafted as a wide receiver for the Kansas City Chiefs in the National Football League, where he remained for four seasons.  He also was listed for two years on the roster of the Indianapolis Colts but ultimately retired due to injury.

Football executive
Dawson served as the Vice President of Football Operations for the Tennessee Titans from 2011 to 2015. Dawson was hired by the Buffalo Bills in May 2017 to be Assistant Director of College Scouting.

References

External links
Tennessee Titans bio

1972 births
Living people
Sportspeople from Boston
American football wide receivers
Buffalo Bills scouts
Notre Dame Fighting Irish football players
Kansas City Chiefs players
Players of American football from Boston
Ed Block Courage Award recipients